Chapel Hill is a town in Orange, Durham and Chatham counties in the U.S. state of North Carolina. Its population was 61,960 in the 2020 census, making Chapel Hill the 17th-largest municipality in the state. Chapel Hill, Durham, and the state capital, Raleigh, make up the corners of the Research Triangle (officially the Raleigh–Durham–Cary combined statistical area), with a total population of 1,998,808.

The town was founded in 1793 and is centered on Franklin Street, covering . It contains several districts and buildings listed on the National Register of Historic Places. The University of North Carolina at Chapel Hill and UNC Health Care are a major part of the economy and town influence. Local artists have created many murals.

History

Pre-establishment and colonial era

The Occaneechi Indians lived in the area of what is now  Hillsborough, north of Chapel Hill, prior to European settlement. 

The area was the home place of early settler William Barbee of Middlesex County, Virginia, whose 1753 grant of 585 acres on the north and south side of "Lick Branch" from John Carteret, 2nd Earl Granville was the first of two land grants in what is now the Chapel Hill-Durham area. Though William Barbee died shortly after settling there in 1758, one of his eight children, Christopher Barbee, became an important contributor to his father's adopted community and to the fledgling University of North Carolina. In 1792, he offered the trustees of UNC 221 acres on which the university is now built, making him the university's largest donor.

Chapel Hill has developed along a hill; the crest was the original site of a small Anglican "chapel of ease", built in 1752, known as New Hope Chapel. The Carolina Inn now occupies this site. In 1819, the town was founded by the NC General Assembly to serve the University of North Carolina and developed around it. The town was chartered in 1851, and its main street, Franklin Street, was named in memory of Benjamin Franklin.

Civil War

Four in ten Chapel Hillians were enslaved at the start of the Civil War, and about half of the town was Black. In April of 1865, as the war ended, the 9th Michigan Cavalry rode into Chapel Hill and occupied the university and the town for more than two weeks.

Civil Rights Era

In 1969, a year after the city fully integrated its schools, Chapel Hill elected Howard Lee as mayor. It was the first majority-white municipality in the South to elect an African-American mayor. Serving from 1969 to 1975, Lee helped establish Chapel Hill Transit, the town's bus system, and the Mountains-to-Sea trail.

Some 30 years later, in 2002, the state passed legislation to provide free service to all riders on local buses. The bus operations are funded through Chapel Hill and Carrboro town taxes, federal grants, and UNC student tuition. The change has resulted in a large increase in ridership, taking many cars off the roads. Several hybrid and articulated buses have been added recently. All buses carry GPS transmitters to report their location in real-time to a tracking web site. Buses can transport bicycles and have wheelchair lifts.

In 1993, the town celebrated its bicentennial and founded the Chapel Hill Museum. This cultural community resource "exhibiting the character and characters of Chapel Hill, North Carolina" includes among its permanent exhibits Alexander Julian, History of the Chapel Hill Fire Department, Chapel Hill's 1914 Fire Truck, The James Taylor Story, Farmer/James Pottery, and The Paul Green Legacy.

In addition to the Carolina Inn, the Beta Theta Pi Fraternity House, Chapel Hill Historic District, Chapel Hill Town Hall, Chapel of the Cross, Gimghoul Neighborhood Historic District, Alexander Hogan Plantation, Old Chapel Hill Cemetery, Old East, University of North Carolina, Playmakers Theatre, Rocky Ridge Farm Historic District, and West Chapel Hill Historic District are listed on the National Register of Historic Places.

Geography and climate

Chapel Hill is located in the southeast corner of Orange County. It is bounded on the west by the town of Carrboro and on the northeast by the city of Durham. However, most of Chapel Hill's borders are adjacent to unincorporated portions of Orange and Durham Counties rather than shared with another municipality. University Lake is part of the town's public water supply.

Demographics

Durham, North Carolina, is the core of the four-county Durham-Chapel Hill MSA, which has a population of 504,357 as of Census 2010. The US Office of Management and Budget also includes Chapel Hill as a part of the Raleigh-Durham-Cary Combined Statistical Area, which has a population of 1,749,525 as of Census 2010. Effective June 6, 2003, the Office of Management and Budget redefined the federal statistical areas and dismantled what had been for decades the Raleigh-Durham-Chapel Hill MSA, and split them into two separate MSAs, though the region functions as a single metropolitan area.

2020 census

As of the 2020 United States census, there were 61,960 people, 20,369 households, and 10,552 families residing in the town.

2010 census
According to the 2010 U.S. Census, 57,233 people in 20,564 households resided in Chapel Hill. The population density was 2,687 people per square mile (1037/km). The racial composition of the town was 72.8% White, 9.7% African American, 0.3% Native American, 11.9% Asian, 0.02% Pacific Islander, 2.7% some other race, and 2.7% of two or more races. About 6.4% of the population was Hispanic or Latino of any race.

Of the 20,564 households, 51.1% were families, 26.2% of all households had children under the age of 18 living with them, 40.2% were headed by married couples living together, 8.2% had a female householder with no husband present, and 48.9% were not families. About 30.6% of all households were made up of individuals, and 7.7% had someone living alone who was 65 years of age or older. The average household size was 2.35 and the average family size was 2.98.

In the town, the population was distributed as 17.4% under the age of 18, 31.5% from 18 to 24, 23.6% from 25 to 44, 18.4% from 45 to 64, and 9.2% who were 65 years of age or older. The median age was 25.6 years. For every 100 females, there were 87.2 males. For every 100 females age 18 and over, there were 83.6 males.

According to estimates released by the U.S. Census Bureau, over the three-year period of 2005 through 2007, the median income for a household in the town was $51,690, and for a family was $91,049. Males had a median income of $50,258 versus $32,917 for females. The per capita income for the town was $35,796. About 8.6% of families and 19.8% of the population were below the poverty line, including 8.6% of those under age 18 and 5.6% of those age 65 or over.

Chapel Hill is North Carolina's best-educated municipality, proportionately, with 77% of adult residents (25 and older) holding an associate degree or higher, and 73% of adults possessing a baccalaureate degree or higher.

Government

Chapel Hill uses a council-manager form of government. The community elects a mayor and eight council members. Mayors serve two-year terms, and council members serve staggered four-year terms, all elected by the city at large; city elections are held in November of odd-numbered years. Mayor Pam Hemminger, a former board of education member, was elected in 2015 and re-elected in 2017, 2019, and 2021. She is currently serving her fourth term. She defeated incumbent Mark Kleinschmidt, who in 2009 had been elected the first openly gay mayor of Chapel Hill, succeeding outgoing four-term Mayor Kevin Foy.

The town adopted its flag in 1990. According to flag designer Spring Davis, the blue represents the town and the University of North Carolina (whose colors are Carolina blue and white); the green represents "environmental awareness"; and the "townscape" in the inverted chevron represents "a sense of home, friends, and community."

The town's seal, has, since the 1930's, depicted Athena, the Greek goddess of wisdom and protector of cities. Having gone through several revisions, the seal, which also serves as the town logo, was most recently updated in 2005 to a visually simpler version.

Education 

The Chapel Hill-Carrboro school district covers most of the towns of Chapel Hill and Carrboro, along with portions of unincorporated Orange County, and is recognized for its academic strengths. East Chapel Hill High School, Carrboro High School, and Chapel Hill High School have all received national recognition for excellence, with Newsweek in 2008 ranking East Chapel Hill High as the 88th-best high school in the nation, and the highest-ranked standard public high school in North Carolina. The small portion of Chapel Hill located in Durham County is part of Durham Public Schools.

There are several private K-12 schools in Chapel Hill, including Emerson Waldorf School.

Founded in 1789, the University of North Carolina at Chapel Hill is a public research university and is the flagship of the University of North Carolina system.

The state's main youth orchestra, Piedmont Youth Orchestra, is based in Chapel Hill.

Culture

Though Chapel Hill is a principal city of a large metropolitan area, it retains a relatively small-town feel. Combined with its close neighbor, the Chapel Hill-Carrboro area has roughly 85,000 residents. Many large murals can be seen painted on the buildings. Most of these murals were painted by UNC alumnus Michael Brown. Also, for more than 30 years, Chapel Hill has sponsored the annual street fair, Festifall, in October. The fair offer booths to artists, craftsmakers, nonprofits, and food vendors. Performance space is also available for musicians, martial artists, and other groups. The fair is attended by tens of thousands each year.

The Morehead Planetarium was the first planetarium built on a U.S. college campus. When it opened in 1949, it was one of six planetariums in the nation and has remained an important town landmark. During the Mercury, Gemini, and Apollo programs, astronauts were trained there. One of the town's hallmark features is the giant sundial, located in the rose gardens in front of the planetarium on Franklin Street.

Influences of the university are seen throughout the town, even in the fire departments. Each fire station in Chapel Hill has a fire engine (numbers 31, 32, 33, 34, and 35) that is Carolina blue. These engines are also decorated with different UNC decals, including a firefighter Rameses.

Chapel Hill also has some new urbanist village communities, such as Meadowmont Village and Southern Village. Meadowmont and Southern Village both have shopping centers, green space where concerts and movies take place, community pools, and schools. Also, a traditional-style mall with a mix of national and local retailers is located at University Place.

Food
Hailed as one of America's Foodiest Small Towns by Bon Appétit, Chapel Hill is rapidly becoming a hot spot for pop American cuisine. Among the restaurants noted nationally are Mama Dip's (Food Network's $40 A Day With Rachael Ray), Crook's Corner, Sunrise Biscuit Kitchen (The Splendid Table), caffè Driade (Food Network's $40 A Day With Rachael Ray), Lantern Restaurant (Food & Wine, Southern Living, etc.), and Vimala's Curryblossom Cafe.

Music
In the realm of popular music, James Taylor, George Hamilton IV, Southern Culture on the Skids, Superchunk, Polvo, Archers of Loaf, Ben Folds Five, The Kingsbury Manx, Spider Bags and more recently Porter Robinson, are among the most notable musical artists and acts whose careers began in Chapel Hill. The town has also been a center for the modern revival of old-time music with such bands as the Ayr Mountaineers, Hollow Rock String band, Mandolin Orange, the Tug Creek Ramblers, Two Dollar Pistols, the Fuzzy Mountain String band, Big Fat Gap and the Red Clay Ramblers.

Chapel Hill was also the founding home of now Durham-based Merge Records. Bruce Springsteen has made a point to visit the town on four occasions. His most recent appearance was on September 15, 2003, at Kenan Memorial Stadium with the E Street Band. U2 also performed at Kenan on the first American date of their 1983 War Tour, where Bono climbed up to the top of the stage, during pouring rain and lightning, holding up a white flag for peace. The 2011 John Craigie song, "Chapel Hill", is about the singer's first visit there. One song from Dirty, a Sonic Youth album, is named after the town.

Sports 

The University of North Carolina has been very successful at college basketball and women's soccer, and a passion for these sports has been a distinctive feature of the town's culture, fueled by the Tobacco Road rivalry among North Carolina's four ACC teams: the North Carolina Tar Heels, the Duke Blue Devils, the NC State Wolfpack, and the Wake Forest Demon Deacons.

The two largest sports venues in the town both house UNC teams.  The Dean Smith Center is home to the men's basketball team, while Kenan Memorial Stadium is home to the football team.  In addition, Chapel Hill is also home to Carmichael Arena which formerly housed the UNC men's basketball team, and currently is home to the women's team, and to the new Dorrance Field, home to men's and women's soccer and lacrosse teams.

Many walking/biking trails are in Chapel Hill. Some of these include Battle Branch Trail, Morgan Creek Trail and Bolin Creek Trail, Chapel Hill's oldest trail and most popular greenway.

Media
 WCHL: local AM radio station (1360AM, 97.9FM) providing talk radio, news, and local sports coverage as the flagship station of the Tar Heel Sports Network.
 WUNC: local public radio station (91.5FM) located on the UNC campus.
 WXYC: noncommercial student-run radio station (89.3FM) on the UNC campus. In 1994, it became the first radio station in the world to broadcast over the internet.
 The Daily Tar Heel is the nationally ranked, independent student newspaper that serves the university and the town. The free newspaper is printed thrice weekly during the academic year and weekly during summer sessions.
 The Sun Magazine is an independent, ad-free magazine that for more than 40 years has published personal essays, interviews, short stories, poetry, and photographs.
 Carrboro Citizen was a locally owned community newspaper covering local news, politics and town government of Chapel Hill and Carrboro. The last issue was published in October 2012.
 The metro area has TV broadcasting stations that serve the Raleigh-Durham Designated Market Area (DMA) as defined by Nielsen Media Research.

Transit

Bus 
Chapel Hill has intracity bus service via Chapel Hill Transit. Go Triangle provides connection to the rest of the Triangle (Raleigh, Durham, and Hillsborough), of which the Hillsborough service is operated by Chapel Hill Transit, and supplemented mid-day by a county shuttle.

Light rail 
The Durham–Orange Light Rail line, which would have run between Chapel Hill and Durham, entered planning and engineering phases in August 2017. The project was discontinued in April 2019.

Notable people

 Alice Adams, author
 Emil Amos, musician
 K. A. Applegate, author
 Owen Astrachan, Duke Professor of Computer Science
John David Roy Atchison (1954–2007), Assistant US Attorney and children's sports coach, committed suicide in prison after being charged with soliciting sex from a 5-year-old girl 
 George A. Baer (1903–1994), bookbinder
 Stephen Barrett, retired psychiatrist, webmaster of Quackwatch
 Lewis Black, stand-up comedian, author, actor
 Ash Bowie, musician
 Steve Breedlove, clergyman, bishop in the Anglican Church in North America
 Sean Bridgers, actor, screenwriter, director, producer
 Fred Brooks, computer scientist
 Christopher Browning, historian
 Cam Cameron, football coach
 Spencer Chamberlain, musician
 Doug Clark and the Hot Nuts, band.
 Fred C. Cole, librarian and historian
 Elizabeth Cotten, musician
 Floyd Council, blues singer, the "Floyd" after which Pink Floyd is named
 Butch Davis, former UNC football coach
 Hubert Davis, UNC basketball coach, ESPN analyst, former NBA basketball player
 Walter Royal Davis, North Carolina philanthropist and oil tycoon
 Anoop Desai, finalist on American Idol, singer 
 Sarah Dessen, author
 David Drake, science fiction and fantasy novelist and small-press publisher
 Elizabeth Edwards, late wife of former U.S. Senator of North Carolina John Edwards
 John Edwards, former presidential candidate
 Lawrence Ferlinghetti, Beat Generation poet and co-founder of City Lights Book Sellers & Publishers. Earned a B.A. in Journalism from UNC-Chapel Hill in 1941.
 Ben Folds, musician
 Paul Green, playwright
 John Grisham, author
 Meredith Hagner, actress, portrays Liberty Ciccone on As the World Turns
 Bernardo Harris, former NFL linebacker
 Dave Haywood, musician, member of the country music group Lady Antebellum
 Bunn Hearn, MLB pitcher
 Jack Hogan, actor, noted for his role as Private William Kirby on Combat! television series, 1962–1967 
 Laurel Holloman, artist and actress. Known for The L Word television series.
 George Moses Horton, a slave poet, called "the black bard of Chapel Hill"
 Paul Jones, computer technologist
 Michael Jordan, six-time NBA champion, basketball hall of famer, national champion at UNC
 Alexander Julian, fashion designer
 Michelle Kasold, Olympic field hockey player
 Charles Kuralt, journalist
 Kay Kyser, big band leader, entertainer
 Howard Lee, first black mayor of a predominantly white city
 William Carter Love, U.S. Representative from North Carolina during the 1800s
 Mandolin Orange, Andrew Marlin and Emily Frantz, a folk/americana duo
 Mac McCaughan, musician
 Nick McCrory, Olympic bronze medalist in diving
 Richard McKenna, novelist, The Sand Pebbles
 Mark Newhouse, professional poker player
 Mojo Nixon - singer
 Marty Ravellette armless hero
 David Rees, political satirist, cartoonist of Get Your War On
 Porter Robinson, electronic music producer
 Brian Roberts, former MLB second baseman, two-time All-Star
 Dexter Romweber, rockabilly roots-rocker
 Aziz Sancar, winner of the 2015 Nobel Prize in Chemistry
 Betty Smith, novelist, A Tree Grows in Brooklyn
 Dean Smith, former basketball coach
 Oliver Smithies, physical biochemist and genericist, Nobel prizewinner
 Elizabeth Spencer, author of The Light in the Piazza, currently resides in Chapel Hill
 Silda Wall Spitzer, wife of former New York governor Eliot Spitzer
 Chris Stamey, musician
 Leo Sternbach, chemist and discoverer of benzodiazepines
 Matt Stevens, former NFL safety
 James Taylor, musician
 Blair Tindall, author and musician
 Richard Trice, blues guitarist, singer and songwriter
 Willie Trice, blues guitarist, singer, songwriter and record producer. Elder brother of above
 Karl Edward Wagner, horror writer, editor, and small-press publisher
 Daniel Wallace, writer, author of Big Fish: A Novel of Mythic Proportions
 Manly Wade Wellman, novelist
 Roy Williams, men's basketball coach
 Thomas Wolfe, author. UNC alumnus. Chapel Hill appears as "Pulpit Hill" in his posthumous novel You Can't Go Home Again.
 Bayard Wootten (1875–1959), photographer and suffragette

Sister cities
  Puerto Baquerizo Moreno, San Cristóbal (Galápagos, Ecuador)

See also
 List of municipalities in North Carolina
 Chapel Hill Transit
 UNC Health Care
 University of North Carolina at Chapel Hill
 Carolina Brewery
 Chapel Hill Zen Center

References

External links

 
 
 Chapel Hill Memories (preserving the history of Chapel Hill)

Towns in North Carolina
Towns in Orange County, North Carolina
Towns in Durham County, North Carolina
Chapel Hill-Carrboro, North Carolina
Populated places established in 1793
1793 establishments in North Carolina
Research Triangle